The Casa Franceschi Antongiorgi (Franceschi Antongiorgi House), locatedat 25 de Julio St. in Yauco, Puerto Rico, is a house listed on the National Register of Historic Places in 1985. It has also been known as Casa Flemming.

The house was built in 1907-1910 by the French architect André Troublard for Alejandro Franceschi Antongiorgi, a rich landowner and lover of the arts. Antongiorgi frequently held banquets, concerts and meetings with visiting artists in his house.

It is Beaux Arts in style and has Classical Revival details. Architect André Troublard also designed the Logia Masónica Hijos de la Luz, also in Yauco and listed on the National Register.

References

National Register of Historic Places in Yauco, Puerto Rico
Houses completed in 1910
Beaux-Arts architecture in Puerto Rico
Neoclassical architecture in Puerto Rico
Antongiorgi
1910 establishments in Puerto Rico